Dragoș Petre Ser (born 4 March 1999) is a Romanian rugby union rugby player. He plays as a flanker for professional SuperLiga club Steaua București.

Club career

Dragoș Ser played during his career for CSM București from where he transferred to Steaua in 2019 following the dissolution of his former club. He also played for the Romania national under-20 rugby union team.

International career
Ser is also selected for Romania's national team, the Oaks, making his international debut during Week 1 of 2020 Rugby Europe Championship against the Lelos on 1 February 2020.

References

External links

1999 births
Living people
People from Constanța County
Romanian rugby union players
Romania international rugby union players
CSM București (rugby union) players
CSA Steaua București (rugby union) players
Rugby union flankers